EUKOR is a specialised Roll-on/roll-off shipping line formed in 2002.
The company's main business is the sea carriage of new and used cars and High & Heavy cargo.

The name of the brand EUKOR comes from a portmanteau that combines together the words "Europe & Korea".

Company profile
EUKOR is a South Korean company owned by Wilh. Wilhelmsen along with Wallenius Lines, Wallenius Wilhelmsen Logistics, American Roll-on Roll-off Carrier, and United European Car Carriers.

The company tonnage comprise 80 PCC-PCTC vessels transporting about 4 million cars annually, mainly from South Korea to the US and Europe.

The main business consists in the maritime transport and distribution of cargo such as automobiles, trucks, trailers, Mafi roll trailers, heavy construction machineries and further types of rolling freight.

Since 1999, when mv Asian Destiny was launched, the fleet started to include ships capable of carrying over 6,000 cars per voyage.

Over half of the fleet's vessels include the word "Morning" in the first part of their names. The tonnage name idea is linked to the fact that
Korea started to be internationally referred as "the Land of Morning calm", and its ruling monarchy the Joseon, became known abroad as the "Morning Dynasty", when a book written in 1886 by Percival Lowell obtained large success in the United States in narrating the history of the country.

History
Before its re-branding as EUKOR in 2002, the pre-existing company was known as the RORO-Car Carriers arm of Hyundai Merchant Marine. The division was inaugurated in the 1980s when its first car carrier vessel was purchased and named mv Hyundai No.1. Since then, three shipping lanes to Europe, Australia, and India were opened, to compete with the three Japanese shipping lines NYK, Mitsui O.S.K. Lines, and K Line, in the cars transportation and break bulk sectors.

After the purchase by Wilh. Wilhelmsen and Wallenius Lines, the two Scandinavian companies each took 40 percent of the equity in the Hyundai car carriers division, whilst the two cars manufacturers Hyundai Motors and Kia split the remaining 20-percent equity stake. The two Korean carmakers committed to continue to ship their products exclusively through the new joint venture. 

The main purpose of the acquisition was to enable the two Scandinavian companies to fully enter the extremely profitable Korean export market. Through the deal, Wallenius and Wilhelmsen acquired a fleet of nearly 60 vessels that were carrying over 2 million vehicles per year. The acquisition required antitrust approval from the European Commission. To obtain this approval, the parties agreed to terminate the WALLNYK collaboration with Nippon Yusen Kaisha and agreed not to enter into any similar agreements with any competing carrier on the routes in question, without prior Commission consent.

Facts and accidents
On May 24, 2004 the EUKOR operated vessel Hyundai No.105, sailing from South Korea to Germany, collided with a Japanese very large crude carrier (VLCC) close to Singapore Sentosa island in the Malacca Strait, one of the world's busiest sea passages. As result the Hyundai No.105 sank with a total loss of over 3,000 brand new Hyundai/Kia cars and an additional 1,200 used Japanese cars stowed on board. The crew was rescued but the ship could not be salvaged.

On January 6, 2010 the British flagged mv Asian Glory, carrying about 2,400 cars, most of them new Hyundai and Kia models, was sailing from South Korea to Jeddah, Saudi Arabia when it was captured by Somali pirates in the Gulf of Aden.
Asian Glory had a crew of 25, including 8 Bulgarians and 5 Indians, who were finally released in June 2010 following a ransom payment of an undisclosed amount that intelligence reports indicated was close to the $15 million that the pirates were demanding; allegedly, an amount similar to the ship's hull insurance cost and the value of the cargo on board.

On April 19, 2014 a fire started on mv Asian Empire off the coast of Japan, when the vessel was en route from Ulsan to Balboa, Panama. All 24 members of the crew had to be evacuated.
A second fire broke out hours later; the reasons were investigated but remained unclear. Two salvage tugs had to be hired to tow the vessel to China for dry docking.

In 2015 China fined EUKOR 284 million yuan ($42.5 million) for engaging in a cartel. A similar fine was applied to its sister company WWL.

In 2016 Brazilian regulators raised a similar claim and required EUKOR to pay 15.9 million reais. In 2017 a further suit was brought by the U.S. Federal Maritime Commission for price fixing and conspiracy.

On February 21, 2017 the mv Morning Composer was hijacked by Libyan pirates off the coast of Misurata. The vessel was carrying 3,500 Korean brand new cars and 1500 used vehicles. The crew of 12 Filipinos, 10 Bulgarians and 2 Ukrainians were unharmed and freed to restart the journey briefly after the Libyan military intervened on 22nd early morning.

On 28 May 2019, while alongside Ulsan port, a sudden fire broke out on a car deck of the EUKOR operated mv Platinum Ray. The immediate action of the crew and fire brigades could contain the fire and extinguish it within five hours, limiting the damage to only 69 cars of the over 2000 stowed on board.

See also
American Roll-on Roll-off Carrier
Wilh. Wilhelmsen
Hyundai Glovis
Nippon Yusen Kaisha
Siem Shipping
United European Car Carriers
KESS - K Line Europe Short Sea
MV Asian Glory

Ships gallery

References

Shipping companies of South Korea
companies based in Seoul
Transport companies established in 2002
South Korean brands
Car carrier shipping companies
Ro-ro shipping companies